Jiangnan Metropolitan News or Jiangnan Dushibao, also known as Jiangnan Metropolitan Daily or Jiangnan Capital Post or Jiangnan City Daily or Jiangnan Metropolis Daily,  is a simplified Chinese newspaper published in the People's Republic of China.  The newspaper is a comprehensive urban life newspaper sponsored by the Jiangxi Daily Agency (江西日报社).

Inaugurated on April 1, 1994, the predecessor of the paper was Ganjiang Folk News (赣江大众报), which was renamed Jiangnan Metropolitan News on August 1, 1997.

Violated the Chinese government's censorship order
On February 14, 2017, a knife attack occurred in Pishan County, Xinjiang. Only the Jiangnan Metropolitan News violated the Chinese government's censorship order and opened the news post function on this accident, allowing the outside to see the views of Chinese netizens on the attack. In response to this behavior, a researcher of China Department of Human Rights Watch argued that Chinese netizens attacked minority Uyghur Muslims without knowing the truth, and noted that China's internet censorship undermined its own goal.

References

Publications established in 1994
Newspapers published in Asia
Newspapers published in China
Chinese-language newspapers (Simplified Chinese)
1994 establishments in China